Hell to Pay is the ninth studio album by American heavy metal band Dokken, released in 2004. It was produced by Don Dokken himself and is also the first studio album to feature lead guitarist Jon Levin.

Track listing

Personnel
Dokken
Don Dokken – vocals, producer
Jon Levin – guitars
Barry Sparks – bass guitar, backing vocals
Mick Brown – drums, backing vocals

Production
Wyn Davis - engineer, mixing
Brian Daugherty - additional engineering, mixing on track 9
Darian Rundall, Mike Lesniak, Don Dokken - additional engineering
Eddy Schreyer - mastering at Oasis Mastering, Los Angeles

References

Dokken albums
2004 albums
Sanctuary Records albums